Qədimkənd (also, Gadimkend) is a village and municipality in the Neftchala District of Azerbaijan. It has a population of 2,320. The municipality consists of the villages of Gadimkend and Birinji Garaly.

References 

Populated places in Neftchala District